Irma Airport  is located  east of Irma, Alberta, Canada.

References

External links
Page about this airport on COPA's Places to Fly airport directory

Registered aerodromes in Alberta
Municipal District of Wainwright No. 61